Frisby railway station was a former station serving the village of Frisby on the Wreake in Leicestershire. The station was situated at a level crossing on the road to Hoby.

History
The station opened in 1847 on the Syston and Peterborough Railway, but until 1849 it only had a service on Melton market days. It closed in 1961. There were no goods facilities at the station.

Stationmasters
The station masters house was one of the smallest and cheapest on the line between Syston and Melton Mowbray. It was little more than a gatehouse and this may have contributed to the relatively fast turn-over of station masters.

John Thomson ca. 1851 - 1874
J. Lambert 1874 - 1875 (afterwards station master at Wigston South)
G.W. Fenton 1875 - 1876
W. Greenfield 1876 - 1887
S. North 1877 - 1879
F. Gilley 1879
J. Wyldes 1879
Edward Richardson 1880 - 1881 (afterwards station master at Great Glen)
R. Shipway 1881 - 1888
Charles Taylor 1888 - 1892
J.J. Cook 1892 - 1893
R. Higgins 1893 - 1898
Harry Scott 1898 – ca. 1911
H.J. Roberts ca. 1914
A. Alexander (afterwards station master at Manton)

References

Former Midland Railway stations
Disused railway stations in Leicestershire
Railway stations in Great Britain opened in 1847
Railway stations in Great Britain closed in 1961
1847 establishments in England
1961 disestablishments in England